The 2020–21 Liga Nacional de Guatemala season is the 23rd season of the Liga Nacional de Guatemala, the top football league in Guatemala, in which the Apertura and Clausura season is used. The season will begin in August 2020 and will end in May 2021.

Team information 

A total of 12 teams will contest the league, including 10 sides from the 2019–20 Liga Nacional and 2 promoted from the 2019–20 Primera División.

Siquinalá and Mixco were relegated to 2020–21 Primera División the previous season.

The relegated team were replaced by the 2019–20 Primera División winners Achuapa and Sacachispas.

Promotion and relegation 

Promoted from Primera División de Ascenso as of August 2020.

 Champions: Achuapa and Sacachispas

Relegated to Primera División de Ascenso as of August 2020.

 Last Place: Siquinalá and Mixco

Personnel and sponsoring

Managerial changes

Beginning of the season

During the Apertura season

Between Apertura and Clausura seasons

During the Clausura season

Apertura

League table

Group A

Group B

Finals

Clausura

League table

Group A

Group B

Finals

Aggerate League table

</onlyinclude>

List of foreign players in the league
This is a list of foreign players in 2020-2021 season. The following players:
have played at least one apertura game for the respective club.
have not been capped for the Guatemala national football team on any level, independently from the birthplace.  

A new rule was introduced a few season ago, that clubs can only have five foreign players per club and can only add a new player if there is an injury or player/s is released.

Achuapa
  Juliano Rangel
  Nícolas Martínez
  Marlon Negrete
  Joshua Vargas

Antigua
  José Mena
  Juan Osorio
  John Rochford
  Cayo Ribeiro
  Josué Martinez 
  Éver Guzmán
  Genaro Castillo
  Deyner Padilla

Cobán Imperial
  Jorge Sotomayor
  Bladimir Díaz
  Janderson 
  Allan Miranda 
  José Calderón

Comunicaciones  
  Michael Umaña
  Agustín Herrera  
  Andrés Lezcano
  Jose Corena
  Manfred Russell 
  Alexander Robinson
  Júnior Lacayo
  Nicolás Royón

Guastatoya
  Adrián de Lemos
  Luis Landín
  Omar Dominguez 
  Edgardo Ruiz
  Aarón Navarro
  Maximiliano Lombardi

Iztapa
  Nicolás Foglia
   Carlos Felix
  Christian Hernández 
  Jordan Smith

Malacateco
  Darío Silva
  Elmer Morales
  Lauro Cazal 
  Jorge Gatgens
  Orlando Osorio
  Carlos Barrochez
  Santiago Gómez

Municipal 
   Alejandro Díaz 
  Rafael Garcia
  Gustavo Britos
  Steve Makuka
  Jaime Alas
  Gabe Robinson

Santa Lucía
  Rafael da Roza
  Denis Lima
  Thales Moreira
  Romario Da Silva 
  Anllel Porras
  Isaac Acuña

Sanarate 
   Charles Martinez
  Yosel Piedra
  Orlando Moreira
  César Canario 

 Sacachispas
  Jesús Lozano
  Jose Sanchez
  Egidio Arévalo Ríos
  Diego Ávila
  Leandro Rodriguez

Xelajú
  David Monsalve 
  Josue Odír Flores
  Pablo Mignorance 
  Israel Silva
  Leo Bahia
  Alexander Larin
  Jeffrey Payeras
  Juan Yax

External links
 https://lared.com.gt/deportes/futbol/liga-nacional/
 https://www.guatevision.com/etiqueta/futbol-guatemala/

Liga Nacional de Fútbol de Guatemala seasons
1
Guatemala